Impellam Group plc traded on the AIM ("IPEL") is a provider of Managed Services and Specialist Staffing and operates across the UK, North America, Australasia, Europe, and the Middle East.

Impellam Group plc provides jobs at all levels, including doctors, lawyers, accountants, nurses, teachers, scientists, receptionists, drivers, chefs, administrators, engineers, technology specialists, cleaners, security guards, and manufacturing and warehouse operatives.

Julia Robertson has been the CEO of the group since April 2013.

References

External links
Official Website

British companies established in 2008
Companies listed on the Alternative Investment Market
Employment agencies of the United Kingdom
Companies based in Luton